Chalonge is a lunar impact crater that is located on the far side of the Moon. It lies to the southwest of the larger crater Lewis, in the outer skirt of ejecta that surrounds the Mare Orientale impact basin. To the southeast are the Montes Cordillera, a ring of mountains that encircle the Mare Orientale formation.

This is a circular crater with a sharp-edged, outer rim that is not appreciably eroded. The inner walls slope directly down to a ring of slumped material that encircles the interior floor. Chalonge was previously designated Lewis R before being assigned a name by the IAU.

References

 
 
 
 
 
 
 
 
 
 
 
 

Impact craters on the Moon